The name Georgette has been used for eleven tropical cyclones in the Eastern Pacific Ocean. One of these crossed into the Western Pacific Ocean where it degraded into a tropical wave then regenerated into a severe tropical storm.

 Tropical Storm Georgette (1967) – never affected land
 Tropical Storm Georgette (1971) – remained over the open ocean
 Tropical Storm Georgette (1975) – had no impact on land
 Hurricane Georgette (1980) – had no impact
 Tropical Storm Georgette (1986) – weak storm that degraded into a tropical wave and crossed into the Western Pacific where it reorganized 
 Hurricane Georgette (1992) – Category 2 hurricane, remained over the open ocean
 Hurricane Georgette (1998) – Category 3 major hurricane, never affected land
 Tropical Storm Georgette (2004) – remained over the open ocean
 Tropical Storm Georgette (2010) – short-lived storm that struck Baja California Sur
 Hurricane Georgette (2016) – Category 4 major hurricane, churned in the open ocean
 Tropical Storm Georgette (2022) – never affected land 

In the Western Pacific:
Typhoon Georgette (1986) – developed from the Eastern Pacific system of the same name and remained in the open sea

See also
 Tropical Storm George
 List of hurricanes named Georges

Pacific hurricane set index articles
Pacific typhoon set index articles